Jason Belben (born 13 September 1965) is a British sailor. He competed in the men's 470 event at the 1988 Summer Olympics.

References

External links
 

1965 births
Living people
British male sailors (sport)
Olympic sailors of Great Britain
Sailors at the 1988 Summer Olympics – 470
People from Gosport